Sabz Gezi (also Romanized as Sabz Gezī) is a village in Jahadabad Rural District, in the Central District of Anbarabad County, Kerman Province, Iran. At the 2006 census, its population was 474, in 104 families.

References 

Populated places in Anbarabad County